Megacephalomana is a genus of moths of the family Erebidae. The genus was described by Strand in 1943.

This name and Megacephalon are considered by The Global Lepidoptera Names Index to be a synonyms of Facidia Walker, 1865.

Species
Some species of this genus are:

Megacephalomana divisa (Walker, 1865) Sri Lanka
Megacephalomana laportei Berio, 1974 Zaire
Megacephalomana pilosum (Pagenstecher, 1888) Amboina
Megacephalomana remaudi Laporte, 1972 Congo, Gabon
Megacephalomana rivulosum (Saalmüller, 1880) Madagascar
Megacephalomana saalmuelleri (Viette, 1965) Madagascar
Megacephalomana stygium (Saalmüller, 1881) Madagascar

References

 
Calpinae